Hope is an unincorporated community in Osage County, in the U.S. state of Missouri.

History
A post office called Hope was established in 1897, and remained in operation until 1974. The community most likely was named for the attitude of hope.

References

Unincorporated communities in Osage County, Missouri
Unincorporated communities in Missouri
Jefferson City metropolitan area